Castro Street may refer to:

 Castro Street in the Castro District, San Francisco, California
 Castro Street Station, a Muni Metro underground station at the junction of Castro and Market streets in San Francisco
 Castro Street Fair, a street fair in the Castro neighborhood
 Castro Street, the main street of Mountain View, Santa Clara County, California
 Castro Street (film), a 1966 short documentary film directed by Bruce Baillie and set in Richmond, California